Humphrey de Bohun (pronounced "Boon" in Scottish English or Bo-hun or Bow-hun in French) may refer to:
Humphrey with the Beard (fl. 1066), fought at the Battle of Hastings
Humphrey I de Bohun (died c.1123), married Maud, daughter of Edward of Salisbury
Humphrey II de Bohun (died 1164/5), married Margaret, daughter of Miles of Gloucester
Humphrey III de Bohun (died 1181), married Margaret of Huntingdon
Humphrey de Bohun, 2nd Earl of Hereford (Humphrey IV, c. 1204–1275), also 1st Earl of Essex and Constable of England
Humphrey de Bohun, 3rd Earl of Hereford (Humphrey VI, c. 1249–c. 1298), also 2nd Earl of Essex, a key figure in the Norman conquest of Wales
Humphrey de Bohun, 4th Earl of Hereford (Humphrey VII, 1276–1321/2), one of the Ordainers who opposed Edward II's excesses
Humphrey de Bohun, 6th Earl of Hereford (Humphrey VIII, 1309–1361), also 5th Earl of Essex and Lord High Constable of England
Humphrey de Bohun, 7th Earl of Hereford (Humphrey IX, 1342–1373), also 6th Earl of Essex and 2nd Earl of Northampton, an English noble during the reign of King Edward III

Humphrey